Peter Crinnion (born 12 February 1939) is a former Irish cyclist. He competed in the individual road race at the 1960 Summer Olympics.

References

External links
 

1939 births
Living people
Irish male cyclists
Olympic cyclists of Ireland
Cyclists at the 1960 Summer Olympics
People from Bray, County Wicklow